George Hunter (born 20 November 1991 in Stevenage) is an English born Bahamian rugby union player. He previously played for Glasgow Warriors at the Tighthead Prop position.

Early life
He grew up in Aberdeen and was educated at Westhill Academy.

Rugby career

Amateur career

He has represented Aberdeen Wanderers RFC and Glasgow Hawks and Ayr.

Professional career

Hunter was part of the Elite Development Programme attached to Glasgow Warriors.

He broke into the full Warriors squad in 2012. He played against the Ospreys and Leinster in the Pro12; and away to Castres Olympique in December 2012 in his European Champions Cup debut.

He joined London Scottish on loan for a short period at the end of the 2013–14 season before rejoining the Warriors and continuing to play for Ayr RFC.

On 17 July 2015 it was announced that Hunter had secured a short term professional contract with Glasgow Warriors to provide depth and competition for places during the 2015 World Cup when the Warriors will lose a host of their top stars on Scotland duty.

International career

Scotland

He has represented Scotland at Under 17, Under 18 and Under 20 level. He captained the Under 20 side throughout much of 2011. He played for the Scotland Club XV international side.

Bahamas

Although Hunter was eligible to play for Scotland, his grandfather was from the Bahamas. In 2016 Hunter represented the Bahamas at international level. He made his first appearance for the Bahamas in the 2016 Rugby Americas North Championship against Mexico.

References

External links
 profile at Ayr Rugby Club

1991 births
Living people
Anglo-Scots
Ayr RFC players
Bahamas international rugby union players
Glasgow Hawks players
Glasgow Warriors players
London Scottish F.C. players
People educated at Westhill Academy
Rugby union players from Stevenage
Scotland Club XV international rugby union players
Scottish rugby union players
Rugby union props